Eveno-Bytantaysky National District (Ebeen-Bıtantay uluuha) is an administrative and municipal district (raion, or ulus), one of the thirty-four in the Sakha Republic, Russia. Its administrative center is the rural locality (a selo) of Batagay-Alyta. As of the 2010 Census, the total population of the district was 2,867, with the population of Batagay-Alyta accounting for 63.9% of that number.

History
The district was established on April 21, 1989, when its territory was split out of Verkhoyansky District. The district's name refers to its designation as a national (ethnic) district for the Evens, who comprised 32.35% of the population in 1989, as well as its location on the Bytantay River.

Geography
The district is located within the Arctic Circle, between the Lena and Yana Rivers. The western section of the district is dominated by the Verkhoyansk Range, the north and east—by the Kular Mountains.

Administrative and municipal status
Within the framework of administrative divisions, Eveno-Bytantaysky National District is one of the thirty-four in the republic. The district is divided into three rural okrugs (naslegs) which comprise four rural localities. As a municipal division, the district is incorporated as Eveno-Bytantaysky Municipal District. Its three rural okrugs are incorporated into three rural settlements within the municipal district. The selo of Batagay-Alyta serves as the administrative center of both the administrative and municipal district.

Inhabited localities

Economy
The economy of the district depends mainly on agriculture such as reindeer herding and the breeding of cattle and horses. The district is among the most inaccessible territories of the republic.

References

Notes

Sources
Official website of the Sakha Republic. Registry of the Administrative-Territorial Divisions of the Sakha Republic. Eveno-Bytantaysky District.

External links
Yakutia is considered as a promising territory for the development of ecotourism
Как в Якутии развивают арктический туризм
Merlenke nomadic school

Districts of the Sakha Republic
States and territories established in 1989
